Halswelle is a surname. Notable people with the surname include:

 Keeley Halswelle (1831–1891), English artist
 Wyndham Halswelle (1882–1915), British athlete